These are the results of the men's K-2 500 metres competition in canoeing at the 2004 Summer Olympics. The K-2 event is raced by two-man canoe sprint kayaks.

Medalists

Heats
The 19 teams first raced in three heats.  The top finisher in each heat moved directly to the final, and all other teams advanced to the semifinals.  No teams were eliminated in the heats.  The heats were raced on August 24.

Semifinals
The top three finishers in each of the two semifinal races qualified for the final.  Fourth place and higher teams were eliminated.   The semifinals were raced on August 26.

Final
The final was raced on August 28.

References
2004 Summer Olympics Canoe sprint results 
Sport-reference.com 2004 men's K-2 500 m results
Yahoo! Sports Athens 2004 Summer Olympics Canoe/Kayak Results

Men's K-2 500
Men's events at the 2004 Summer Olympics